In mathematics, Hudde's rules are two properties of polynomial roots described by Johann Hudde.

1. If r is a double root of the polynomial equation

and if  are numbers in arithmetic progression, then r is also a root of

This definition is a form of the modern theorem that if r is a double root of ƒ(x) = 0, then r is a root of ƒ '(x) = 0.

2. If for x = a the polynomial

takes on a relative maximum or minimum value, then a is a root of the equation

This definition is a modification of Fermat's theorem in the form that if ƒ(a) is a relative maximum or minimum value of a polynomial ƒ(x), then ƒ '(a) = 0, where ƒ ' is the derivative of ƒ.

Hudde was working with Frans van Schooten on a Latin edition of La Géométrie of René Descartes. In the 1659 edition of the translation, Hudde contributed two letters: "Epistola prima de Redvctione Ǣqvationvm" (pages 406 to 506), and "Epistola secvnda de Maximus et Minimus" (pages 507 to 16). These letters may be read by the Internet Archive link below.

References
 Carl B. Boyer (1991) A History of Mathematics, 2nd edition, page 373, John Wiley & Sons.
 Robert Raymond Buss (1979) Newton's use of Hudde's Rule in his Development of the Calculus, Ph.D. Thesis Saint Louis University, ProQuest #302919262
 René Descartes (1659) La Géométria, 2nd edition via Internet Archive. 
 Kirsti Pedersen (1980) §5 "Descartes’s method of determining the normal, and Hudde’s rule", chapter 2: "Techniques of the calculus, 1630-1660", pages 16—19 in From the Calculus to Set Theory edited by Ivor Grattan-Guinness Duckworth Overlook 

Rules
Theorems in algebra
Polynomials
Calculus